Flinders Commonwealth Marine Reserve is a 27,043km2 marine protected area within Australian waters located off the coast of north-east Tasmania. It extends to the outer limits of the Australian exclusive economic zone in the Tasman Sea. The reserve was established in 2007 and is part of the South-east Commonwealth Marine Reserve Network.

The reserve area contains habitat for lace corals, sea sponges and giant crabs. A prominent feature is a large offshore seamount believed to be too deep to have been fished. Seamounts generally host a wide variety of habitats that support deep ocean biodiversity, the large seamounts to the east of Tasmania are individually important, as they are expected to include endemic species.

Protection
Most of the Flinders marine reserve area is IUCN protected area category II and zoned as 'Marine National Park'. A small portion near the coast is zoned as 'Multiple Use' (IUCN VI).

See also

Commonwealth marine reserves
Protected areas of Australia
Flinders Island
Pacific Ocean

Notes

References

External links
Flinders Commonwealth Marine Reserve Network website

South-east Commonwealth Marine Reserves Network
Protected areas established in 2007